Moore Abbey is a monastic house at Monasterevin in County Kildare.

History
Moore Abbey was designed by the English engineer Christopher Myers in the Gothic style and was built in the late 1760s for the 6th Earl of Drogheda (who later became Field Marshal the 1st Marquess of Drogheda). The 10th Earl of Drogheda abandoned the house after the First World War and it was leased to John Count McCormack, the tenor, from 1925 to 1937. The 10th Earl then put the abbey up for sale shortly after Count McCormack moved out and in 1938 it became the Irish headquarters of the Sisters of Charity of Jesus and Mary, now known as the Muiriosa Foundation.

References

Country houses in Ireland
1767 establishments in the British Empire